William Gilmer Bray (June 17, 1903 – June 4, 1979) was an American lawyer and World War II veteran who served twelve terms as a Republican member of the United States House of Representatives from Indiana from 1951 to 1975.

Early life and career 
Born on a farm near Mooresville, Indiana, Bray attended the public schools of Mooresville, Indiana.
He graduated from Indiana University Law School at Bloomington in 1927 and was admitted to the bar the same year.

He served as prosecuting attorney of the fifteenth judicial district of Indiana, Martinsville, Indiana, from 1926 to 1930.
He commenced the private practice of law in Martinsville, Indiana, in 1930.

World War II 
Called to active duty from the US Army Reserve June 21, 1941, with the rank of captain and served with a tank company throughout the Pacific campaign, receiving the Silver Star.

Post-war career
After the war, he was transferred to Military Government and served nine months in Korea as deputy property custodian.
Bray was released from active duty in November 1946 with the rank of colonel.
He returned to private law practice in Martinsville, Indiana.

Congress 
Bray was elected as a Republican to the Eighty-second and to the eleven succeeding Congresses (January 3, 1951 – January 3, 1975).

Bray voted in favor of the Civil Rights Acts of 1957, 1960, 1964, and 1968, as well as the 24th Amendment to the U.S. Constitution and the Voting Rights Act of 1965.
He was an unsuccessful candidate for reelection in 1974 to the Ninety-fourth Congress.

Later career and death 
He resumed the practice of law following his defeat.

Named to be a commissioner to the American Battle Monuments Commission by President Gerald Ford from 1975 to 1978.

Resided in Martinsville, Indiana, where he died June 4, 1979.
He was interred in White Lick Cemetery, Mooresville, Indiana.

Honors
Bray was an Indiana Freemason, and in 1993, William G. Bray Commandery No. 65 of the Masonic-related Knights Templar of Indiana was chartered in Mooresville in his honor and memory.

References

Specific

1903 births
1979 deaths
People from Mooresville, Indiana
Indiana University Maurer School of Law alumni
United States Army officers
People from Martinsville, Indiana
20th-century American politicians
Republican Party members of the United States House of Representatives from Indiana